Blaming the Duck, or Ducking the Blame is a 1915 silent short film directed by Earl Metcalfe.

Cast
Billie Reeves - Jack, the Husband
Carrie Reynolds - Lucille, the Wife
Arthur Matthews - Lucille's Father
Jessie Terry - Milly, the Cook
Charles Griffiths - Barton, Jack's Pal
Patty De Forest - Miss Simpson
Mary Carr - Mrs. Jones (*as Mrs. Carr)

References

External links
 Blaming the Duck,or Ducking the Blame at IMDb.com

1915 films
American silent short films
Lost American films
Lubin Manufacturing Company films
American black-and-white films
1910s American films